Music Analysis is a peer-reviewed academic journal specializing in music theory and analysis. It is based in England and published its first issue in 1982. Although the journal "is not produced on behalf of a society, it is closely associated with the Society for Music Analysis."

Its website describes Music Analysis as an "international forum for the presentation of new writing focused on musical works and repertoires." It "is eclectic in its coverage of music from medieval to post-modern times, and has regular articles on non-western music. Its lively tone and focus on specific works makes it of interest to the general reader as well as the specialist." The journal has also featured translations of articles by Theodor W. Adorno and Heinrich Schenker.

The journal's first editor-in-chief was Jonathan Dunsby. It is currently edited by Edward Venn (editor-in-chief), Anne Hyland (associate editor) and Chris Stover (critical forum).

References

External links
 

Music theory journals
Contemporary classical music journals
Wiley-Blackwell academic journals
Publications established in 1982
English-language journals
Triannual journals